Glipa satorum is a species of beetle in the genus Glipa. It was described in 2003.

References

satorum
Beetles described in 2003